Thayer & Eldridge (c.1860–1861) was a publishing firm in Boston, Massachusetts, established by William Wilde Thayer and Charles W. Eldridge. During its brief existence the firm issued works by James Redpath, Charles Sumner, and Walt Whitman, before going bankrupt in 1861.

Published by the firm

 Rufus B. Sage. Rocky Mountain Life: Or, Startling Scenes and Perilous Adventures in the Far West, during an Expedition of Three Years. 1859.
 Walt Whitman. Leaves of Grass, 3rd ed. 1860
 Leaves of Grass Imprints. 1860
 James Redpath. The public life of Capt. John Brown. 1860.
 James Redpath, ed. Echoes of Harper's Ferry. 1860.
 Charles Sumner. The Barbarism of Slavery: Speech of Mr. Charles Sumner on the bill for the admission of Kansas as a free state, in the United States Senate, June 4, 1860.
 William T. Adams. Marrying a beggar: or The Angel in disguise, and other tales. 1860.
 William Douglas Conner. Harrington; a Story of True Love. 1860. 
 C.W. Dana. The Great West, Or The Garden of the World: Its History, Its Wealth, Its Natural Advantages, and Its Future. 1861.
 A Son of Temperance ed. Thrilling Scenes in Social Life or The Opposite Effects of Vice and Virtue. 1860

Contracted but not published because of bankruptcy
 Incidents in the Life of a Slave Girl, by Harriet Jacobs under pseudonym, edited by L. Maria Child
 Guide to Hayti, by James Redpath
 Asphodel; a Novel, by Ada Clare

References

Further reading

 W.W. Thayer. "Notes from an Autobiography."  The Conservator (Philadelphia), June 1914. Google books

1860s in the United States
19th century in Boston
Book publishing companies based in Massachusetts
Economic history of Boston
Cultural history of Boston
Publishing companies established in 1860
Manufacturing companies disestablished in 1861
Publishing companies disestablished in the 19th century